Marungoor, also spelt Marungur, is a panchayat town near Suchindrum in Kanniyakumari district in the Indian state of Tamil Nadu. The place sprawls over an area of about 10 km2.

The Subramania Swamy Temple, which is situated atop a small hillock is worth a place to visit. This temple area is called as Kumarapuram thoppur. Because of Kumaran's (Subramania swamy) name. Shashti and Soora Samharam are the famous festivals at this temple. The famous kandhashashti kavasam festival is very popular over here and celebrated as major festival.

Villages Eraviputhoor and Nallur is situated in the west and Mylaudy in the south-east. In the east Ramanathichanputhur Village and in the North Rajavoor village. Suchindram is about five km south-west of Marungoor. Suchindram Kulam, Suchindrum Temple, Thovalai, Kanyakumari and Vattakottai are nearby tourist spots. Trivandrum International Airport is the nearest airport. Marungoor can be reached from Kanyakumari, Nagercoil and Suchindram by bus.

Population
 India census, Marungur had a population of 10,096. Males constitute 49% of the population and females 51%. Marungur has an average literacy rate of 82%, higher than the national average of 59.5%: male literacy is 85%, and female literacy is 80%. In Marungur, 8% of the population is under 6 years of age. The nearby village is "Antony QAntony Vivek"Rajavoor with a sizable Roman Catholic population. The place is known for St Michael's Shrine.The annual feast starts on the first Friday of May with Flag Hoisting followed by a ten-day Mass and adoration. Eight and Ninth day will be marked with the car procession of St Michael the Arch angel. People affiliated to different faith without any difference gather here every Saturday for mass and adoration. The people here are Roman Catholics and parish belongs to the Kottar Diocese. The other part of this village is North Rajavoor blessed with the Our Lady of Presentation Church attached to Rajavoor Parish. The annual feast starts from 24 January to 2 February. The occasion is marked with the Candle Mass.

References

Cities and towns in Kanyakumari district